Ayame is a feminine Japanese given name.

People 
 Yoshizawa Ayame (吉沢菖蒲, 1673–1719), Japanese Kabuki actor
 Yoshizawa Ayame I (初代 吉沢 菖蒲, 1673-1729), Japanese Kabuki actor
 Ayame Goriki (剛力 彩芽, born 1992), Japanese actress and model
 Ayame Koike (小池彩夢, born 1995), Japanese actress
 Ayame Misaki (水崎綾女, born 1989), Japanese actress who is affiliated with Horipro
 Ayame Mizushima (水島あやめ, 1903–1990), Japanese novelist and screenwriter
 Ayame Sasamura (笹村あやめ, born 1995), Japanese professional wrestler

Characters 
 Ayame (Inuyasha), a female wolf in Inuyasha
 Ayame Sohma, a male character in Fruits Basket
 Ayame, a female character in the video game Phoenix Wright: Ace Attorney – Trials and Tribulations
 Ayame, a female samurai and Mythril Musketeer in Final Fantasy XI 
 Ayame, a female messenger in Yu Yu Hakusho
 Ayame (Tenchu), a female character in the Tenchu video games
 Ayame (Power Stone), a female character in the Power Stone video games
 Ayame Ichiraku, a female character from the anime and manga series Naruto
 Ayame, a female character from the anime and manga series Bleach (manga), who is a part of Orihime Inoue's Shun Shun Rikka
 Ayame, a female character and one of the Cerulean sisters in the anime series Pokémon (anime), her name is Violet in the English dub
 Ayame Kimura, a female main protagonist of the series "Agents of Havoc"
 Ayame Yomogawa, a female character in the anime series Kabaneri of the Iron Fortress
 Ayame Kajo, a female character in the anime and manga Shimoneta
 Ayame from Senran Kagura video game franchise
 Ayame Oguni, a female character in Rurouni Kenshin
 Ayame Hatano, the Ultimate Sprinter from Danganronpa Another Despair Academy

See also 
 Ayame (disambiguation)

References 

Japanese feminine given names